Adam Ashburnham was an English MP in the 16th century,  and represented Winchelsea from 1593 to 1597. His grandson was Sir Denny Ashburnham, 1st Baronet, Member of Parliament for Hastings from 1660 to 1689.

References

English MPs 1593